Eduard Mayer (17 August 1812 in Asbacherhütte – 1881 in Bad Aibling) was a German sculptor.

1812 births
1881 deaths
German sculptors
German male sculptors
19th-century sculptors
19th-century German male artists